Eduardo Chávez may refer to:
 Eduardo Chávez (politician)
 Eduardo Chávez (footballer)